Alejandro Manzanera Pertusa (born 8 April 2003) is a Spanish tennis player.

Manzanera Pertusa has a career high ATP doubles ranking of 1533 achieved on 24 August 2020.

Manzanera Pertusa won the 2021 Wimbledon Championships – Boys' doubles title.

Junior Grand Slam titles

Doubles: 1 (1 title)

Future and Challenger finals

Singles: 0 (0–0)

Doubles 6 (1–5)

References

External links

2003 births
Living people
Spanish male tennis players
Wimbledon junior champions
Grand Slam (tennis) champions in boys' doubles